Miloslav Mečíř Jr. (born 20 January 1988) is a Slovak former tennis player. He is the son of Slovak tennis player and Olympic Gold medalist, Miloslav Mečíř. He qualified for his first Grand Slam at the 2014 French Open, but exited at the first round.  On 11 August 2014, he reached his highest ATP singles ranking of 169 whilst his highest doubles ranking was 282 on 8 November 2010.

Career finals

Singles finals

Doubles finals

Singles: 15 (6–9)

Doubles: 4 (2–2)

Singles performance timeline

See also
 Miloslav Mečíř

References

External links
 
 

1988 births
Living people
Slovak male tennis players